Anania bryalis is a moth in the family Crambidae. It was described by George Hampson in 1918. It is found in Kenya and the Democratic Republic of the Congo.

References

Moths described in 1918
Pyraustinae
Moths of Africa